is a Japanese activist who challenges Japanese perceptions of the country's war crimes in the Rape of Nanking during Second Sino-Japanese War.

Being a primary school teacher in Matsubara, Osaka teaching history subject, Matsuoka felt she needed to tell the truth about Japanese war crimes to her students. She went to Nanjing, China for several times to interview hundreds of Japanese veterans and Chinese survivors, and publish books and films showing their memories after Japan captured Nanking. Her works include the 2009 documentary Torn Memories of Nanjing.

Matsuoka is a member of the Japan-China Peace Research Organization which attends the memorial ceremony at the Nanjing Massacre Memorial Hall in Nanjing on August 15 every year to show the regrets of Japanese people to the war crimes.

Threats
Matsuoka has been careful not to publicize her address, for her and her family's safety from Japanese nationalist groups, and has hidden her testimonies to protect them from being stolen or destroyed.

Publications
The following are her books, as listed in WorldCat:
南京戦・閉ざされた記憶を尋ねて : 元兵士102人の証言./Nankinsen tozasareta kioku o tazunete : motoheishi hyakuninin no shōgen. Tōkyō : Shakai Hyōronsha, 2002. 
Chinese translation: 南京战 : 寻找被封闭的记忆 : 侵华日军原士兵102人的证言 = Nanjingzhan : xunzhaobeifengbidejiyi : qinhuarijunyuanshibing102rendezhengyan /
Nanjing zhan : xun zhao bei feng bi de ji yi : qin hua Ri jun yuan shi bing 102 ren de zheng yan = Nanjingzhan : xunzhaobeifengbidejiyi : qinhuarijunyuanshibing102rendezhengyan. Shanghai : Shanghai ci shu chu ban she, 2002.
戦場の街南京 : 松村伍長の手紙と程瑞芳日記 / Senjō no machi Nankin : Matsumura Gochō no tegami to Tei Zuihō nikki. Tōkyō : Shakai Hyōronsha, 2009

References 

1947 births
Living people
Japanese schoolteachers
Japanese film directors
People from Osaka Prefecture
Nanjing Massacre
Japanese human rights activists
Japanese documentary filmmakers
Japanese women film directors
Women documentary filmmakers